The USP-1 "Tyul'pan" (From Russian: Унифицированный Стрелковый Прицел, первый образец, Unifitsirovannyj Strelkovyj Pritsel, pervyj obrazets, "Unified Firearm Sight, first model, GRAU index 1P29) is a Soviet/Russian universal optic sight, designed for use on the AK rifle family (AKMN, AK-74N, AK-74M, AK-101, AK-102, AK-105), the RPK-74N, the PKMN and the PKP "Pecheneg" and is designed for quick-mounting and quick-detaching. Compared with an open mechanical sight, the effectiveness of firing at targets is increased 1.2 to 2 times, and the time taken to conduct a firing session is reduced by 60%. It is designed by TsKB "Tochpribor" in Novosibirsk. Production is conducted in Novosibirsk instrument manufacturing factory (NPZ).

Design 
The sight possesses a mechanism for adjustments and a stadiametric rangefinder. No batteries are required in the sight. The optic scheme of the sight is a prismatic wrapping. It is easily mounted on the weapon using the standard Warsaw Pact rail. The sight is a copy of the British L2A2 Sight Unit Infantry Trilux.

Specifications 
 Sight weight: 0.8 kg
 Weight of a complete sight system: 1.25 kg
 Magnification: 4x
 Field of view: 8 (14) degrees
 Exit pupil diameter: 6.5 mm
 Exit pupil length: 35 mm
 Resolution limit: 13 sec
 Amount of light retained: >70 %
 Adjustment range for zeroing: 0 – 400 m for vertical and horizontal adjustments
 Dimensions (L x H x W): 203 mm x 80 mm x 178 mm

Literature (in Russian) 
 Изделие 1П29. Техническое описание и инструкция по эксплуатации, АЛ3.812.129 ТО. — 1994 г.
 Оружие ближнего боя России / Альманах. — М.: НО «Лига содействия оборонным предприятиям», 2010. — 660 с. —

References 

Firearm components
Optical devices